Shakara! is a comics character appearing in the British magazine 2000 AD, starring in their own eponymous story, who was created by Robbie Morrison and Henry Flint.

Plot

The story is technically set in the present day (the first episode briefly shows a contemporary Earth; it is destroyed on the first page, and the last human in the universe, a survivor from the International Space Station, is ignominiously killed on the third), but revolves around a host of bizarre aliens using very advanced technology.

In the first series little is explained about the lead figure other than  it is nearly indestructible, seeking out and destroying other aliens for reasons unknown. In the second series the character is shown to be some kind of liquid being encased in the suit. By the third, it becomes clear that 'Shakara' is an instrument of vengeance created by a now-extinct race of the same name, although the being is beginning to think for itself.

Bibliography

Comics

All installments are written by Robbie Morrison and drawn by Henry Flint.

Shakara!:
Shakara: The Avenger (trade paperback, 160 pages, January 2009) collects:
 Shakara (in 2000 AD Prog 2002 & #1273-1279, 2001-2002, hardcover, Rebellion Developments, 56 pages, 2005)
 "The Assassin" (in 2000 AD #1441-1449, 2005)
 "The Defiant" (in 2000 AD Prog 2008 & #1567-1573, 2008)
 Shakara: The Destroyer (trade paperback, 160 pages, August 2012) collects:
 "Destroyer" (in 2000 AD #1650-1661, 2009)
 "Avenger" (in 2000 AD #2011, 1715-1727, 2011)

Photostory

Paul Scott and Ben Clark have created 3 Shakara Photo-stories that are available online from 2000 AD's website.

References

Shakara at 2000 AD online

2000 AD characters